is an anime television series sequel to Revival of The Commandments. The new series was animated by Studio Deen instead of A-1 Pictures and premiered on October 9, 2019. Susumu Nishizawa and Rintarō Ikeda replaced Takeshi Furuta and Takao Yoshioka as director and series composer respectively, with Hiroyuki Sawano, Kohta Yamamoto, and Takafumi Wada returned to reprise their roles as the music composers. The series was broadcast on TV Tokyo and BS TV Tokyo. The arc was globally released on August 6, 2020 on Netflix as "Imperial Wrath of the Gods". The first opening theme song is "ROB THE FRONTIER" by Uverworld, and the first ending theme song is "Regeneration" by Sora Amamiya. The second opening theme song is "delete" by SID and the second ending theme is "Good day" by Kana Adachi.



Episode list

References

External links
Official anime website

2019 Japanese television seasons
2020 Japanese television seasons
3
Seven deadly sins in popular culture